Vincent Stewart, codenamed Redneck and later Skybolt is a fictional mutant character in the Marvel Comics Universe.

Publication history
His first appearance was in New X-Men #126 by Grant Morrison and Frank Quitely.

Fictional character biography
Vincent Stewart, the young mutant called Redneck, was a student of the Xavier Institute. He came from a large family in Arkansas, experienced first-hand violence against mutants and became friends with fellow student Radian. Redneck was ready to fight Cassandra Nova as she made her second assault. Instead, Redneck became mentally controlled by Nova and was forced to fight the X-Men on her behalf. Redneck and the other students were freed soon after by the Stepford Cuckoos.

Sometime after, Redneck joined Quentin Quire, also known as Kid Omega, and his group. This small team of mutants was dubbed the Omega Gang. As the Omega Gang later attacked a small group of humans to avenge the mutant fashion designer Jumbo Carnation, Redneck used his powers to burn one of the humans.

When Kid Omega and his gang started a riot at the Xavier Institute, Redneck was stopped by Cyclops, whose optic blasts broke his nose. As his punishment for his involvement in the riot, Redneck was sent to a prison run by humans. As informed by Wolverine, once his sentence would be up, he would be sent overseas to do charity work. He was later questioned about the drug Kick by Bishop. Redneck lost his mutant powers after the event called M-Day.

He would later be offered membership in the newest incarnation of the New Warriors. After being given a flight suit and new technological weaponry based on the designs of the Beetle and the Turbo suit to replace his lost powers he adopted the codename Skybolt, and began training with the team, which included his former Omega Gang teammate Tattoo, now using the code-name Longstrike. However, on one of the team's first missions out to stop the Zodiac, Longstrike got too cocky when fighting Cancer, and was brutally killed in front of the rest of the team. Vin didn't seem too saddened by Christine's death, even criticizing her work ethic in front of her brother shortly after her death. Although callous and harsh, he shows a commitment to the New Warriors and their cause. He was later killed along with Ripcord.

Powers and abilities
Using a suit and weapons derived from technology used by the Beetle and Turbo, Skybolt can fly and fire an array of both lethal and non-lethal projectiles from his wrist-mounted gauntlets. He is also armored in an osmium alloy, making him durable enough to act as a human battering ram.

Before losing his mutant powers, Redneck had the superhuman ability to generate intense heat from his hands.

References

Characters created by Frank Quitely
Characters created by Grant Morrison
Fictional characters from Arkansas
Fictional characters with fire or heat abilities
Marvel Comics mutants
Marvel Comics superheroes
Marvel Comics supervillains